USNS Kiska (T-AE-35), ex-USS Kiska (AE-35) was one of five ammunition ships operated by Military Sealift Command of the Naval Fleet Auxiliary Force.  The ship was laid down on 8 April 1971 at Ingalls Shipbuilding, Pascagoula, Mississippi as USS Kiska (AE-35) and was launched on 11 March 1972. Originally commissioned on December 16, 1972 she was decommissioned on 1 August 1996, and that same day entered service with Military Sealift Command as USNS Kiska (T-AE-35).  She continued to operate under Military Sealift Command's control until she was deactivated at Pearl Harbor, Hawaii, on January 15, 2011. Kiska was the eighth and final ship of the  ammunition ships. Kiska was disposed of by Navy title transfer to the Maritime Administration as of May 30, 2013. Kiska was completely dismantled to its material content by Esco Marine, Inc. in Brownsville, Texas on November 20, 2013.

References

External links

 

Kilauea-class ammunition ships
Ships built in Pascagoula, Mississippi
1972 ships